Women in the Pakistan Armed Forces are the female officers who serve in the Pakistan Armed Forces. Women have been taking part in Pakistani military since 1947, after the establishment of Pakistan. In 2006, the first women fighter pilot batch joined the combat aerial mission command of PAF.
The Pakistan Navy prohibits women from serving in the combat branch. Rather, they are appointed and serve in operations involving military logistics, staff and senior administrative offices, particularly in the regional and central headquarters. There was a rise in the number of women applying for the combat branch of PAF in 2013.

Women cannot join the armed forces as ordinary soldiers, airmen or sailors; these posts are only open to men; women can only get commission. Total 4,000 women have served the armed forces until 2017.

In the 1930s and early 1940s, Muslim women who would go on to opt for Pakistan played an extremely vital role in the success of the Pakistan Movement. The founding mothers of Pakistan include
Fatima Jinnah, Begum Ra'ana, and Shireen Jinnah.

Women in the Pakistan Army 
 

In 1948, the first lady of Pakistan, Begum Ra'ana, took the lead in starting the women's voluntary service in 1948 to support the medical and logistics for the Pakistan Army engage in the Indo-Pakistani war of 1947. This led to the formation of a women's unit in the Pakistan Army Corps of Medical; a first attempt was also made in introducing the combat training program for women but such attempts were dismissed by General Frank Messervy. In 1949, the first lady Ra'ana Liaquat Ali Khan took personal initiatives and established her own Women's National Guard (WNG), women were encouraged to take up responsibilities in administering first aid, organizing food distribution, dealing with health problems, epidemics and clothing, and above all, in providing moral and emotional support. The all-women unit's chief controller was Begum Ra'ana herself, with the honorary rank of brigadier. All women serving here were described as militias. The organization was speedily disbanded.

In the 20th century, women were restricted from participating in active duty combat operations, although a sizable portion of women officers was deployed in hostile areas to support the medical operations only.

In 2002, Shahida Malik was promoted to a two-star rank and was the first female Major General. Shahida Badshah was the second woman to be promoted to Major General.

From the Pakistan Military Academy, first batch of female cadets was commissioned on 15 April 2007 (following a six months training); passing out parade was reviewed by General Pervez Musharraf. Prior to that, women were not trained at the Pakistan Military Academy and 'Lady Cadet Course' was introduced in 2006. Till 2020, 16 'Lady Cadet Course' batches have been commissioned.

In 2015, brigadier Nigar Johar, became the first woman to command in the history of the Pakistan Army. She was given command of multidisciplinary tertiary care hospital. In 2017 she became the third woman in Pakistan to reach the rank of major general. She belongs to the Army Medical Corps. She has been appointed as the Vice Principal of Army Medical College Rawalpindi as a Major General. In 2020, Johar became the first and only woman in the history of Pakistan Army to reach the rank of lieutenant-general.

Lieutenant Colonel Shahida Akram Bhurgri, of Pakistan Army Medical Corps, is the first female doctor from Sindh to be commissioned in the Pakistan Army.

Apart from the Indo-Pakistani War of 1971 and the post-1971 war, due to a growing need for ground forces, women were needed in roles in the field. The manpower shortages spurred the army to allow women to take part in fields related to medicine and engineering. Since its establishment, women have been historically barred from battle in the Pakistan Army, serving in a variety of technical and administrative support roles. Since 2004, women have been trained in warfare, but are not part of any fighting formations.  Women who are appointed to high-ranking positions usually participate in medical operation planning.

On 14 July 2013, 24 female officers in the Pakistan Army, mostly doctors and software engineers, successfully completed a paratroopers' course at the Parachute Training School, becoming the first group of women to do so in the military's history.

Since 2019, Pakistan Army has also started increasing the number of female officers serving in UN missions abroad. The army has been fulfilling the UN quota of 15% female representation in peace missions since mid-2019.

On January 31, 2020, the first ever Pakistani Female Engagement team in any United Nations (UN) mission around the globe received UN medals for serving in the Peacekeeping Mission in the Democratic Republic of the Congo. The team, later joined by another 17 female officers, on February 3, were deployed to South Kivu. The UN medal is awarded for participation in military and police operations for the United Nations. These missions include disaster relief, peacekeeping and humanitarian efforts.

Applauding the contingent's performance during the peacekeeping mission, United States chief diplomat for South Asian affairs, Alice Wells, has stated that she is "inspired by Pakistani women serving with distinction in the UN peacekeeping mission in the DRC."

Pakistan Army doesn't allow women to join in the infantry, artillery and armored units, also women who are commissioned in various branches are not allowed to serve more than ten years except the medical corps where women can serve 30 to 35 years, e.g. Nigar Johar became a lieutenant-general in 2020 after serving 35 years in medical corps of the army.

Women in Pakistan Air Force 
In 2003, the Pakistan Air Force (PAF) started a new combat programme by inducting women to be trained as fighter pilots. In 2006, the first batch of women fighter pilots joined the combat services of the PAF. The then vice chief of army staff General Ahsan Saleem Hyat handed certificates of honour to the successful men and women cadets in the PAF Academy. Women fighter pilots the F-7 fighter jets and are trained in carrying out the bombing and aerial combat missions.

The women in Pakistan Air Force also operate a women's welfare organization (officers and airmens wives welfare), the Pakistan Air Force Women Association (PAFWA), to promote women to join the PAF as combat pilots and to promote women's health in the Air Force.

Flight Lieutenant Ayesha Farooq was the first Pakistani fighter pilot.

Flying Officer Marium Mukhtiar was the first female pilot of the PAF to die in a routine exercise.

Women are not be allowed to join the pilots' branch every year and women are not allowed to serve more than 5 years, but in some cases they may be permitted to serve for 7 years.

Women in Pakistan Navy 
The Pakistan Navy does not allow women to serve in the combat roles. Women are allowed to serve in certain branches like IT, Engineering, Medical, Education, Logistics and Public Relations. Women are not taken every year like the air force, moreover women are granted short service commission in which they can serve for 5 years.

Begum Ra'ana Liaquat Ali Khan, as First Lady of Pakistan from 1947 to 1951, helped establish the Pakistan Woman Naval Reserves in the Navy, and was appointed as the Chief Controller.  The first batch of female officers in the Navy were inducted in August 1997, who were specialised as pharmacists, dietitians, public relations officers and statisticians.

References

 
Military of Pakistan
Women in Pakistan
Women in 21st-century warfare
Women in warfare post-1945